Calinaga cercyon is a  butterfly found in the Palearctic that belongs to the browns 
family. It is endemic to West China  and East Tibet.

Description from Seitz

C. cercyon Nicev. (59e) has the markings quite similar to [saka Moore form of Calinaga buddha] -, but the ground is yellowish; moreover, the position of the distal spots of the forewing is somewhat different, so that we apparently have to do with a distinct species.— West China: Ta-tsien-lu.

References

Calinaginae
Butterflies described in 1897